Safi (in Arabic:إقليم آسفي) is a province of Morocco, in the Marrakesh-Safi region. The province takes its name from its capital Safi. Its population in 2004 is 881,007.

The major cities and towns are:
 Bouguedra
 Hrara
 Jamaat Shaim
 Laâkarta
 Safi
 Sebt Gzoula

Subdivisions
The province is divided administratively into the following:

References

 
Safi Province